Selatosomus melancholicus is a species of click beetles native to Europe. This species is in the subgenus Pristilophus, which some authorities treat as a separate genus (e.g.).

References

Elateridae
Beetles described in 1798
Beetles of Europe